Eupatorium compositifolium, commonly called Yankeeweed, is a North American herbaceous perennial plant in the family Asteraceae native to the southern United States (from North Carolina to Florida and Texas). Like other members of the genus Eupatorium it has inflorescences containing a large number of small, white flower heads, each with 5 disc florets but no ray florets. The plant is  0.5 to 2 metres (20-80 inches) tall. Flowers bloom August to October. Its habitats include sand dunes, disturbed areas, and flat-woods. 

It is closely related to Eupatorium capillifolium and Eupatorium leptophyllum and some authors consider all of them to be varieties of E. capillifolium.  However, E. compositifolium is not as tall as E. capillifolium and is found in drier areas.

Because it is not grazed by livestock, and mostly not eaten by wildlife, it is considered undesirable in places like pastures and controlled by means such as herbicides.

References

compositifolium
Flora of the United States
Plants described in 1788